Bodarli is a village in Burhanpur district of Madhya Pradesh, India. Bodarli is a village with a population of nearly 6,000.

References 

Villages in Burhanpur district
Articles containing video clips